The Nampa American Legion Chateau at 1508 2nd St., S., in Nampa, Idaho, is listed on the National Register of Historic Places.  It was designed by Tourtellotte & Hummel in 1931.

It was listed on the National Register of Historic Places in 1982.

It is a "fanciful" and "picturesque" design.  The building is one-story and arranged in an L-shape.

References

American Legion buildings
Buildings and structures completed in 1931
National Register of Historic Places in Canyon County, Idaho
Clubhouses on the National Register of Historic Places in Idaho
Nampa, Idaho